Jungle Strut is a single by Japanese Jazz fusion band T-Square, who were then known as The Square. The single was released in 1982 and included as a demonstration tape in newly purchased Sony Walkman cassette players.

References

1982 singles
1982 songs